Maraghei is a dialect of the Tati language, spoken in the Gilan Province, and upper Rudbar area (Rudbar-e Alamut). The Maraghei Tati is closely related to Talysh and Gozarkhani, and falls under the Qazvinic (spoken in the Qazvin Province) language. One dialect spoken is Dikini, there are also various other dialects.

References

Languages of Iran
Northwestern Iranian languages